The Steel Plant Employees Union (SPEU) is a trade union at the Visakhapatnam Steel Plant in Visakhapatnam, India. SPEU is affiliated to the Centre of Indian Trade Unions. The SPEU general secretary is V. Dhanaraju.

References

Trade unions in India
Trade unions of the Visakhapatnam Steel Plant
Centre of Indian Trade Unions
Year of establishment missing